Since the late-2000s, the People's Republic of China (PRC) has sought to internationalize its official currency, the Renminbi (RMB). RMB internationalization accelerated in 2009 when China established the dim sum bond market and expanded Cross-Border Trade RMB Settlement Pilot Project, which helps establish pools of offshore RMB liquidity. The RMB was the 8th-most-traded currency in the world in 2013 and the 7th-most-traded in early 2014. By the end of 2014, RMB ranked 5th as the most traded currency, according to SWIFT's report, at 2.2% of SWIFT payment behind JPY (2.7%), GBP (7.9%), EUR (28.3%) and USD (44.6%). In February 2015, RMB became the second most used currency for trade and services, and reached the ninth position in forex trading. The RMB Qualified Foreign Institutional Investor (RQFII) quotas were also extended to five other countries — the UK (extended 15 October 2013), Singapore (22 October 2013), France (20 June 2014), Korea (18 July 2014), Germany (18 July 2014), and Canada (8 November 2014), each with the quotas of ¥80 billion except Canada and Singapore (¥50bn). Previously, only Hong Kong was allowed, with a ¥270 billion quota.

The launch of Shanghai–Hong Kong Stock Connect (SSE and HKEx) in November 2014 embarked China upon the next stage of internationalization. In January 2015, Chinese Premier Li Keqiang announced a planned second Stock Connect linking Shenzhen and Hong Kong exchanges. China's RMB internationalization and foreign exchange (FX) reforms are evolving rapidly and full convertibility is expected over the next couple of years. In 2014, Hong Kong removed the conversion limit of 20,000 RMB per day for its residents.

History 
Until the early years of the 21st century, the Renminbi was not fully convertible and its flow in and out of China faced heavy restrictions. Under instructions from the Chinese government, the People's Bank of China (PBoC) began the move to full convertibility beginning around 2008. This has taken the form of permitting the use of RMB outside China for all current account transactions such as commercial trade, payment of services, interest payment, dividend payment, etc. and the use of RMB for certain approved capital account transactions such as foreign direct investment (FDI) and outward direct investment (ODI). Central banks and offshore Participating banks can invest excess RMB in the mainland interbank bond market through the China Interbank Bond Market (CIBM quota), invest into mainland China (through the RQFII quota), invest into offshore from mainland (through the QDII quota), including the onshore individual investment to offshore through the Qualified Domestic Individual Investors program (so-called QDII2).

According to the Society for Worldwide Interbank Financial Telecommunication (SWIFT), the path of RMB internationalisation can be divided into three phases—first as usage for trade finance, then for investment, and in the longer term, as reserve currency.

Before 2004, the yuan was not allowed outside of China. In 2004, China started to allow border trading in yuan, especially in the Southern and Western border. HKMA first raised with the PBoC the idea of introducing personal renminbi business in Hong Kong as early as November 2001, to facilitate economic and social exchanges between Hong Kong and the Mainland and to channel renminbi cashnotes in Hong Kong back to the Mainland orderly through the banking system. In November 2003, the State Council approved the introduction of personal renminbi business in Hong Kong, which was followed by the appointment of the Clearing Bank, and establishment of payment system linkages and arrangements for cross-border renminbi cashnote delivery. Banks in Hong Kong started to offer renminbi deposit-taking, currency exchange, remittance and debit and credit card services to personal accounts on 25 February 2004. , 1.47% of world payments was settled in RMB, which ranked RMB as the 7th most traded currency in the world. The average monthly RMB trade settlement rose from CN¥320 billion in 2013 to ¥480bn in 2014.

2007: Creation of Dim Sum bonds and offshore RMB bond market  
The dim sum bond market generally refers to RMB-denominated bonds issued in Hong Kong. The majority of dim sum bonds are denominated in CNH, but some are linked to CNY (but paid in USD). In July 2007, dim sum bonds worth a total of US$657 million were issued for the first time by the China Development Bank. These financial assets were issued to foreign investors in renminbi, rather than the local currency.

In June 2009, China allowed financial institutions in Hong Kong to issue dim sum bonds. HSBC was the first institution that issued these. In August 2010, McDonald was the first corporation that issued dim sum bonds. In October, the Asian Development Bank (ADB) raised a ¥1.2bn 10-year bond, and became the first supranational agency which issued dim sum bonds and also the first issuer listed in the HKSE. The dim sum bond market grew 2.3 times from 2010 (¥35.8bn) to 2013 (¥116.6bn), with an outstanding amount at the end of 2013 of RMF 310bn.

In August 2012, China and Taiwan signed a memorandum of understanding on new cross-strait currency settlement, and in March 2013, China Trust Commercial Bank became the first to issue RMB bonds in the Taiwan market (Formosa bond). In November, CCB (Hong Kong) issued a Formosa bond after mainland banks became eligible.

2008: Cross-Border Trade RMB Settlement Pilot Project 
Phase I: on 24 December 2008, China allowed import and export in RMB between (i) Yunnan province and countries in GMS including ASEAN countries (ii) Guangdong province and Hong Kong and Macau.

Phase II: on 1 July 2009, China officially announced regulation on the RMB Settlement Pilot Project and opened up Shanghai and four cities in Guangdong (Guangzhou, Shenzhen, Zhuhai and Dongguan) with Hong Kong, Macau and ASEAN countries.

On 1 July 2010, it expanded to Mainland Designated Enterprises (MDE) in 20 pilot areas (4 municipalities [Beijing, Tianjin, Chongqing, Shanghai], 12 provinces [Liaoning, Jiangsu, Zhejiang, Fujian, Shandong, Hubei, Guangdong, Hainan, Sichuan, Yunnan, Jilin, Heilongjiang] and 4 autonomous regions [Guangxi, Inner Mongolia, Xinjing Uygur, Tibet]), which allow cross border payments of current account items with any country in the world.

By 2014, RMB cross-border trade settlements reached RMB 5.9 trn making a 42.6% (year-over-year) increase, which represents 22% of China's trading volume.

2009: Offshore Renminbi (CNH) 
Since 2009, China has signed currency swap agreements with numerous countries and regions such as Argentina, Belarus, Brazil, Canada, ECB, Hong Kong, Iceland, Indonesia, Malaysia, Singapore, South Korea, Thailand, the United Kingdom, Uzbekistan and Tajikistan. The renminbi deposits in HK gradually grew from ¥12 billion in 2004 to ¥59 billion in 2009.

On 17 August 2010, PBoC issued a policy to allow Central Banks, RMB offshore Clearing Banks and offshore Participating Banks to invest excess RMB in debt securities or in the onshore Inter-bank Bond Market. In October, China further opened up both FDI and ODI in RMB (Pilot RMB Settlement of Outward Direct Investment) and nominated Xinjiang as the first pilot province (which, in early 2011, expanded to 20 pilot areas). In November 2010, China and Russia began trading in their own currencies, abandoning the United States dollar as the medium of exchange in bilateral trade. This was soon followed by Japan in December 2011. On 19 December, the direct trading of yuan against Thai baht was launched in CFETS (Interbank FX trading system) in Yunnan and on 31 December, PBC released the Announcement of the People’s Bank of China Concerning the Implementation of Measures for the Pilot Program of Allowing Fund Management Companies and Securities Companies Approved as Renminbi Qualified Foreign Institutional Investors (RQFII) to Invest in Domestic Securities Market. The RQFII program allows RMB investment funds to be set up in Hong Kong and invest in mainland China's securities markets.

In the first quarter of 2011, the Renminbi surpassed the Russian rouble in terms of international trading volume for the first time in history.

2013: Shanghai Free Trade Zone (SFTZ) 
In June 2013, the United Kingdom became the first G-7 country to set up an official currency swap line with China.

The Shanghai Free-Trade Zone (SFTZ) was launched on 29 September 2013 with key implementation details announced in May 2014. The SFTZ was being used as a test ground for trade, investment and financial reforms, before the roll out to nationwide. The RMB can flow freely between Free Trade Accounts (FTA), non-resident onshore accounts and offshore accounts. Transactions between resident onshore accounts outside SFTZ and FTA with the same entity are also allowed, provided they do not involve capital account transactions that are not yet approved by PBoC and SAFE.

As of 2013, the RMB is the 8th most traded currency in the world.

As of July 2014, 25 countries have signed the RMB Bilateral Swap Agreement with PBoC with total facilities of over ¥2.7 trillion.

The scale of the offshore renminbi (CNH) market is still limited at the moment, with offshore renminbi deposits (around ¥1.5 trillion, of which 70% are in Hong Kong) only about 1% of that onshore (around ¥100 trillion), which is much lower than the ratio of 30% of offshore versus onshore US dollar deposits. The average daily turnover of offshore renminbi foreign exchange market (CNH) was about US$20 billion by the end of 2013. On 17 November, synchronised with the Shanghai–Hong Kong Stock Connect debut, the HKMA has lifted the daily yuan conversion cap (¥20,000).

2016: Cross Border Financing 
Effective from 3 May 2016, PBoC expanded its pilot program for macro prudential management of cross-border financing from FTZ to nationwide.

2019: QFII and RQFII lifted 
In September 2019, SAFE announced that the QFII (launched 2002) and RQFII (since 2011) quotas are revoked. RMB's share as a global payment currency ranked #5 as of August 2019 with market share of 2.22% preceding by USD (42.52%), EUR (32.06%), GBP (6.21%) and JPY (3.61%)

2020: QFII and RQFII merged 
In September 2020, PBOC and SAFE announced that the QFII and RQFII, the two major inbound investment programs, will be combined starting in November. Other changes include simplified application, shorten review cycle, no restriction on intermediary, reduced data submission requirements and expanded scope of investment. Separately SAFE granted additional US$3.36 billion to 18 institutions under QDII scheme, bringing the total scheme to US$107.34 billion between 157 institutions.

FTSE Russell includes Chinese government bonds in FTSE World Government Index (WGBI).

RMB as a reserve currency 

The road to the RMB Internationalization is far from complete.
 First, the size of the home economy must be large relative to others. In this, China is clearly justified.
 Second, economic stability in the form of low inflation, small budget deficits and stable growth is also important. China's record of supportive government policies and macro-economic stability has undoubtedly contributed to the RMB's appeal in recent years. The bursting of Japan's bubble in the early 1990s was arguably one of the main reasons why yen internationalization stalled. 
 Third, strong official and institutional support. This was an important reason for the dollar's adoption as a global currency after the Second World War, formalised through the Bretton Woods system. China has been doing that in the last few years, promoting the use of RMB and its infrastructure with ASEAN, Russia, United Kingdom, Germany, Canada, Australia, etc. At the China Development Forum in March 2014, the People's Bank of China (PBoC) stressed the importance of strengthening financial regulations, establishing a deposit insurance scheme and improving market-driven exit mechanisms for financial institutions, while pushing forward reforms.
 Fourth, deep, open and well-regulated capital markets are necessary so the currency can be used to finance trade as well as provide a large enough market in securities for investors. The opening up of China's onshore capital market will be an important step in the RMB becoming a major investment currency. This is one area where progress has been deliberately slow. For the RMB to be a truly global and become a more widely held reserve currency there needs to be greater access for foreign investors to local capital markets, even deeper global RMB liquidity and wider cross-border flow channels.
On 14 August 2020, the People's Bank of China released the "Report on the Internationalization of RMB in 2020". The report said that RMB's function of reserve currency has gradually emerged. In the first quarter 2020, the share of RMB in global foreign exchange reserves rose to 2.02%, a record high. As of the end of 2019, the People's Bank of China has set up RMB clearing banks in 25 countries and regions outside of Mainland China, which has made the use of RMB more secure and transaction costs have decreased.

Major milestones
 2002, Domestic Securities Investment by Qualified Foreign Institutional Investor (QFII regulation) was announced in November allowed foreign investors to access mainland stock markets (A-shares) 
 2003. PBoC designates BoC-HK as RMB clearing and settlement bank. 
 2004, RMB deposits in Hong Kong is allowed. By the end of 2013 RMB deposits totalled ¥860 billion, an increase from ¥315 billion in 2010, which account for around 12% of total deposits in the Hong Kong banking system, up from 1% in 2008.
 2006 (Apr), the Chinese government announced the Qualified Domestic Institutional Investor (QDII) scheme, allowing Chinese institutions and residents to entrust Chinese commercial banks to invest in financial products overseas. The investment was initially limited to fixed-income and money market products.
 2007, establishment of the Offshore RMB bond market—'dim sum bonds'—which has doubled in size each year since 2008.
 2008 (Dec), implementation of Cross-Border Trade RMB Settlement Pilot Project. The first Bilateral Swap Agreement was signed with South Korea. 
  2011 (Dec), PBC released the Announcement of the People's Bank of China Concerning the Implementation of Measures for the Pilot Program of Allowing Fund Management Companies and Securities Companies Approved as Renminbi Qualified Foreign Institutional Investors (RQFII) to Invest in Domestic Securities Market. The RQFII program allows RMB investment funds to be set up in Hong Kong and invest in mainland China's securities markets. As of July 2014, the RQFII scheme as extended to six countries with total approved quotas of ¥640bn. 
 In December 2013, the RMB overtook the euro to become the second most-used currency in global trade finance after the US dollar, according to the Society for Worldwide Interbank Financial Telecommunication (SWIFT).  
 2014 (April), the China Securities Regulatory Commission (CSRC) and the Securities & Futures Commission of Hong Kong (SFC) announced in a joint statement a trial trading program known as Shanghai-Hong Kong Stock Connect, which will allow two-way cross-market stock investment by qualified Mainland Chinese and Hong Kong investors. The pilot program will operate between the Shanghai Stock Exchange (SSE), the Stock Exchange of Hong Kong Limited (SEHK), the China Securities Depository and Clearing Corporation Limited (ChinaClear) and the Hong Kong Securities Clearing Company Limited (HKSCC).  SSE and SEHK will allow investors to trade eligible shares listed on each other's markets through local securities firms or brokers.  
 2014 (May), Shanghai Free Trade Zone materialized and later (15 July), SAFE issued Circular 36 to extend benefits to foreign-invested enterprises (FIEs) in other 16 industrial parks and economic zones.  
 as of August 2014: (i) more than 10,000 financial institutions are doing business in RMB, up from just 900 in June 2011; (ii) the RMB is now used to settle 18% of China's total trade, from just 3% in 2010; (iii) China has currency swap agreements with 25 central banks with the total amount of over ¥2.7 trillion; (iv) there are now eight official offshore RMB clearing centres – Hong Kong, Macau, Taiwan, Singapore, London, Germany, Korea, and the latest is Canada (signed November 2014).  
 2014 (17 Nov), the Shanghai-Hong Kong Stock Connect debuted with a bang, hitting its RMB13bn one-day trading cap at 13:57 HK time (less than five hours after markets opened).
 2015 (Jul), PBoC open up the $5.7 trn interbank bond market to foreign Central Banks, Sovereign Wealth Funds and international financial institutions. Previously quota was given to the relevant foreign investors on a case-by-case basis. The relevant investors can conduct trading of cash bond, repo, bond lending, bond forward, interest rate swap, forward rate agreement and other transactions permitted by the PBC. Relevant overseas institutional investors can decide on their own the size of their investments. 
 2015 (11 Aug), PBoC improved the quotation mechanism of USD/CNY to become more market-based. 
 2015 (8 Oct), the China International Payments System (CIPS) is launched, as an alternative to SWIFT.
 2016 (24 Feb), PBoC lifted the barrier into China Interbank Bond market (IBB), the world 3rd largest credit market (RMB 48 trn). 
 2016 (3 May), PBoC expended the pilot program for macro prudential management of cross border financing from free trade zone to nationwide.
 2016 (24 June), direct RMB/KRW trading in CFETS
 2016 (Aug), the World Bank, the first issue of SDR bonds in CIBM (SDR 500m, 3-year payable in RMB) with bid-to-cover ration of 2.47
 2016 (1 Oct), RMB is included in SDR Basket (i.e. 41.73% USD, 30.93% EUR, 8.33% JPY, 8.09% GBP and 10.92%  CNY)
 2017 (16 May), PBC and HKMA jointly announced Bond Connect to enable bond trading between Mainland and HK institutional investors 
 2018 (Mar), Oil futures contract launched, denominated in yuan, on the Shanghai International Energy Exchange.
2019 (3 July), chongwa (Macau) Financial Assets Exchange Co., Ltd(MOX). and China central Depository & Clearing Co., Ltd. held a memorandum of cooperation signing ceremony in Macau.This signing is the perfect combination of Macau bond market infrastructure and mainland bond market infrastructure, marking the interconnection of domestic and foreign bond markets in terms of issuance, registration and custody.
2019 (11 June). RQFII and QFII quotas are lifted
2020 RMB share of foreign exchange market rose to 4.3% (up 0.3% from 2016), ranked 5th globally but only used for 1.76% of payments, despite China 10% contribution of global trade in goods. More than 70 central banks and monetary authorities have already incorporated RMB into their FX reserves. PBoC said China will further facilitate cross-border use of RMB to boost trade and investment.

Implications for the financial industry 
 Trade settlement  - The internationalization of the RMB allows foreign companies trading with mainland Chinese companies to settle the trade in RMB, thus, reducing FX cost, open up the opportunity to the larger markets and often secure better trade terms. 
 Financing and borrowing  - creation of dim sum and offshore RMB bond markets offer RMB borrows the chance to access a competitive and diversify funding sources. It is also opened up opportunities for international and retail investors.  
 Capital management  - free trade zone companies may borrow and lend funds directly with overseas (RMB cash pooling). This allows multinational companies to centrally manage their funds and make payments directly in RMB globally.
According to the Society for Worldwide Interbank Financial Telecommunication (SWIFT), many financial institutions are currently building up an RMB trade settlement, payments, foreign exchange, derivatives and clearing capabilities because the internationalization of the RMB has led to new sources of revenue for banks.

[need elaboration on the impacts to the certain aspects to RMB internationalization e.g. on the importance of BSA, the offshore Clearing banks, Commodity prices index to RMB, RMB as Central Banks' reserve currency, etc.]

List of RMB Bilateral Swap Agreements

List of RQFII program licences and quotas

List of RMB Offshore Clearing Bank 

The accumulated RMB clearing amount has reached 40 trn yuan, grew 1300% from 2013 to 2014.

Proposed Clearing Hubs

Renminbi hubs outside China 
[need elaboration on the benefits of RMB Clearing Banks outside of mainland and China International Payments System (CIPS)]

Australia 
China is Australia's largest trading partner (AUD 120 billion in 2013) and in March 2012, the Reserve Bank of Australia (RBA) signed the 3-year RMB Bilateral Swap Agreement with the PBoC worth RMB200bn.

18 February 2014, the Australian Securities Exchange Limited ("ASX") and BoC signed an agreement for clearing and settlement in RMB (in Australia). In April, the RBA announced that it would invest up to 5% of its foreign reserves in RMB Sovereign bond. On 17 November, RBA and PBoC signed an MOU to established official RMB Clearing arrangements in Australia and PBoC granted RMB 50bn RQFII quota to Australia, which will allow approved Australian domiciled FI to invest in China's domestic bond and equity markets using RMB.

Canada 
On 8 November 2014, Canada became the first country in the Americas to sign a reciprocal currency deal with China, enabling direct business between the Canadian dollar and the Chinese yuan.

Germany (BoC) 
On 19 June 2014, Based on the MoU signed by the People's Bank of China and the Bundesbank, the PBoC has authorized the Frankfurt Branch of Bank of China to serve as the RMB clearing bank in Frankfurt. China is EU's No. 1 supplier of goods and its third largest export market. Eu-China annual trade could grow 1.5 times in a decade's time (to EUR 660bn). Germany is China's largest trading partner in the EU (EUR 138.6bn in 2013), which accounted for 45% of EU's exports to China and 28% of EU's imports from China. The RMB was used for 29% in the eurozone (and 38% of non-eurozone Europe's) from 19% a year earlier. The volume of RMB deposit has climbed to 100bn at end-2013.

Hong Kong and Macau (BoC) 
Since 2010 CNH deposit has grown 12 times from RMB 90 bn to 1,125 bn by 1H2014 while Trade Settlement handled by Hong Kong Banks and CNH Bond outstanding increases 107 times (RMB 27 bn to 2,926 bn) and 12 times (RMB 30 bn to 384 bn) respectively. As of 2014, Hong Kong is still the largest offshore RMB (CNH) hubs outside of mainland China. On 10 April, CSRC and Hong Kong's SFC jointly announced Shanghai-Hong Kong Stock Connect (SHKSC) pilot programme – which allows Hong Kong investors to buy Shanghai-listed A-shares and vice versa – is scheduled to start operation on 13 October 2014 with the quota for inward investments in A-shares by Hong Kong residents of CNY 300bn (the actual opening was on 17 November where the daily limited was reached, mainly from the Northbound trade, after market opened less than 5 hours).

London (CCB) 
In 2013, London accounted for over 60% percent of all renminbi-denominated trade activity outside Chinese territory, with daily volume rising to £3.1 billion.

On 18 June 2014, PBoC appointed China Construction Bank (London) to serve as the RMB Clearing Bank in London. The UK leads Europe with 123.6% growth in RMB payment between July 2013 to July 2014.

in 2018, London came 2nd (after Hong Kong, 79.05%) is RMB settlement (5.17%) through SWIFT, followed by Singapore, US and Taiwan. However London topped the list (36.07%) in term of FX transactions in RMB (inter-bank transactions based on MT300), followed by Hong Kong (29.61%)

Luxembourg 
In May 2011, the first Dim sum bond issued by a European company outside Greater China was listed on the Luxembourg Stock Exchange.

In the first quarter of 2014, Luxembourg confirmed its position as the number one in renminbi business in Europe and the third worldwide. RMB deposits increased by 24% to ¥79.4bn compared to 2013 year's end.

In May 2014, the first Dim Sum bond issued by a Chinese entity in the Eurozone was listed at the Luxembourg Stock Exchange, the so-called Schengen bond.

Luxembourg is the largest RMB securities settlement centre and leading place for RMB denominated bonds in Europe with RMB 79bn in deposits and over RMB 261 bn in investment funds registered.

Malaysia 
In October 2011, Khazanah Nasional Bhd issued the first ever offshore RMB denominated sukuk, raising RMB500m .

In July 2014, SWIFT ranked Malaysia as top ten offshore RMB centres. Its RMB trade settlement volume as tripled since 2010 to RMB3bn (in 2013) while RMB deposit to (10.7bn) and FX volume ($580m per day) increased more than ten and fifteenfold since 2010 respectively. As of mid-2014, Malaysian firm's RMB Bond issuance reached RMB4.4bn.

On 5 January 2015, PBoC designated Bank of China (Malaysia) as the yuan Clearing Bank in Malaysia.

Moscow 
On 15 December 2010, the Moscow Interbank Currency Exchange (MICEX) became the first regulated market to trade the renminbi outside China, with a relatively modest first session turnover of ¥4.9 million, or 22.8 million roubles, after one hour of trading.

In 2011, MICEX was incorporated into the Moscow Exchange where the renminbi continued to trade against the ruble. In 2012, the volume of renminbi traded increased by 70% compared to the previous year.

From April to June 2013, the average daily value of renminbi traded on the Moscow Exchange grew nearly fourfold, surpassing ¥30 million for the first time. On 3 July 2013, it reached an all-time high of ¥55.2 million.

Paris 
In 2013, renminbi-denominated deposits in Paris amounted to ¥10 billion, making it the second largest pool of Chinese currency in Europe after London.

Singapore (ICBC) 

According to the Monetary Authority of Singapore (MAS), the usage of the renminbi in Singapore has increased by 40% since 2012, with total renminbi-denominated deposits valued at more than ¥140 billion.

On 7 February 2013, PBoC designated ICBC (Singapore) as the yuan Clearing Bank in Singapore.

On 7 March 2013, PBoC renew the 3-year BSA with MAS and double the facility to ¥150bn (30 billion Singapore dollars)

In June 2014, PBoC and MAS jointly announced the Suzhou Industrial Park (SIP) initiative, which clearly suggested China's recognition of Singapore as an offshore Yuan center following Hong Kong (with Qianhai) and Taiwan (with Kunshan).

On 28 October 2014 direct currency trading started between the Singapore dollar and the renminbi (CNY/SGD). The Singapore dollar was added to the China Foreign Exchange Trade System's (CFETS) platform, which as of 28 October 2014 offers financial operations and transactions between the yuan and ten foreign currencies.

South Korea (BoCOM) 
On 4 July 2014, PBoC appointed Bank of Communication (Seoul) as the RMB Clearing Bank in South Korea.

Switzerland 
On 21 July 2014, the People's Bank of China and the Swiss National Bank had signed a bilateral currency swap agreement.

Taiwan (BoC) 
On 11 December 2012, PBoC authorized Bank of China (Taipei) to serve as RMB Clearing Bank in Taiwan. The CNH deposit in Taiwan at RMB 301bn is second only to Hong Kong (945 bn) as of November 2014.

Tokyo 
In 2012, direct transactions between the Japanese yen and the renminbi began, with Sumitomo Mitsui Banking Corporation acting as the first major Japanese bank to accept deposits in renminbi.

List of foreign banks that trade renminbi  
BNP Paribas
HSBC
Standard Chartered Bank
Credit Agricole CIB
Deutsche Bank
Bank of America
Citigroup
Mitsubishi UFJ Financial Group
Japan Post Bank
Bank of East Asia
Bank of Singapore
DBS Bank
Busan Bank
Daegu Bank
KASIKORNBANK
Bangkok Bank
Siam Commercial Bank
Bank of the Philippine Islands
Malayan Banking Berhad
Commonwealth Bank of Australia

Criticism 
The German news magazine Der Spiegel criticized Chinese moves towards attempting to establish the Yuan as a reserve currency as unrealistic, as doing so would ultimately require removing capital controls, which China is reluctant to lift because they enable it to establish a favorable exchange rate.

Gordon G. Chang, author of The Coming Collapse of China, argued that China's "excessively selfish" currency policy does not sit well with other nations, and such efforts to loosen control of the renminbi is part of China's ploy to deflect international pressure.

Use in Zimbabwe
The RMB was at one point one of the currencies legal tender in Zimbabwe's multiple currency system (2015-2019).

See also 

 List of countries by leading trade partners
 List of the largest trading partners of China
 Renminbi currency value
 Monetary policy of China

References 

Currency
Currencies of Zimbabwe
International finance
Renminbi